Ralph Kenneth Johnson (born February 12, 1947) is a former professional American football defensive lineman in the National Football League (NFL) for the Cincinnati Bengals. He played college basketball at Indiana University.

Early years
Johnson had to repeat the fifth grade because of low grades and was cut from both his junior high school football and basketball teams. He would eventually develop into a top athlete at Anderson High School, where he received All-State and All-American honors in both sports as a senior (in football as an End). 

He accepted a basketball scholarship from Indiana University, to play under coach Lou Watson. As a sophomore, he was a backup, averaging 5.9 points and 6.5 rebounds per game.

As a junior, he was named the starter at center, averaging 18.2 points and 12.2 rebounds per game, while being voted team MVP. As a senior, he began to experiment with alcohol and drugs, which although it was speculated on the media that it affected his play on the court, he would repeat as the team MVP and received All-Big Ten honors, after averaging 14.7 points and 10.5 rebounds per game.

Professional career

Dallas Cowboys
Johnson was selected by the Cleveland Cavaliers in the 10th round of 1970 NBA draft, after dropping because of character concerns. Indiana Hoosiers men's basketball coach Bob Knight recommended Johnson to vice president of player personnel Gil Brandt, who retrospectively said "Our mistake with Johnson was that we tried to make him into an offensive tackle. The Bengals [who later claimed Johnson on waivers from the Cowboys] tried him on the defensive line. That was where he belonged". 

In 1970, although he never played a down of college football, after a successful tryout he signed with the Dallas Cowboys as an undrafted free agent, with the intention of playing him at tight end. He followed on the foot steps of Cornell Green, Peter Gent and Percy Howard, as basketball players that were converted by the Cowboys to play professional football. He was eventually moved to offensive tackle and waived before the start of the season on September 2.

Cincinnati Bengals
On September 2, 1970, Johnson was claimed off waivers by the Cincinnati Bengals, with the intention of playing him at defensive end. He was released on September 7 and signed to the taxi squad the next day.

In 1971, he made the team as a backup defensive lineman, playing both as a defensive tackle and defensive end. In 1972, he appeared in 11 games, starting 3 of them in place of injured players.

In 1974, he was named the starter at left defensive end. In 1976, the Bengals traded for Coy Bacon, who played at a Pro Bowl level and relegated Johnson back into a reserve role.

In 1977, he was lost for the season after injuring his knee in the 10th game against the Miami Dolphins. He was released on August 29, 1978.

Personal life
Johnson became an assistant pastor at the Greater Atlanta Healing Temple. He is also a motivational speaker for the Sports World Ministries. In 1977, he nearly died when his vehicle was hit and dragged by a train for more than 100 yards.

References

External links
Defensive End Johnson Earns Bengals' Stripe
Bengals Then and Now: DE Ken Johnson

1947 births
Living people
Sportspeople from Anderson, Indiana
Players of American football from Indiana
American football defensive ends
Indiana Hoosiers men's basketball players
Cincinnati Bengals players
Cleveland Cavaliers draft picks
American men's basketball players
Centers (basketball)
Anderson High School (Anderson, Indiana) alumni